Massachusetts Senate's 1st Essex district in the United States is one of 40 legislative districts of the Massachusetts Senate. It covers 23.0% of Essex county population. Democrat Diana DiZoglio of Methuen has represented the district since 2019.

Locales represented
The district includes the following localities:
 Amesbury
 Haverhill
 Merrimac
 Methuen
 Newburyport
 North Andover
 Salisbury

The current district geographic boundary overlaps with those of the Massachusetts House of Representatives' 1st Essex, 2nd Essex, 3rd Essex, 14th Essex, 15th Essex, and 17th Essex districts.

Towns formerly represented

The district previously covered the following:
 Lynn, circa 1860s; circa 1948; circa 1987 
 Lynnfield, circa 1860s; circa 1987 
 Marblehead, circa 1860s; circa 1987 
 Nahant, circa 1860s; circa 1948; circa 1987 
 Saugus, circa 1860s; circa 1987 
 Swampscott, circa 1860s; circa 1948; circa 1987

List of senators 

 William Fabens, circa 1859 
 George H. Sweetser (1867, 1869)
 William Schouler (1868)
 Harmon Hall (1876, 1880–1881)
 John R. Baldwin (1882–1884)
 Eugene A. Bessom, circa 1894
 William Salter 
 George Jackson 
 Charles Benjamin Frothingham

Images
Portraits of legislators

See also
 List of Massachusetts Senate elections
 List of Massachusetts General Courts
 List of former districts of the Massachusetts Senate
 Other Essex County districts of the Massachusett Senate: 2nd, 3rd; 1st Essex and Middlesex; 2nd Essex and Middlesex
 Essex County districts of the Massachusetts House of Representatives: 1st, 2nd, 3rd, 4th, 5th, 6th, 7th, 8th, 9th, 10th, 11th, 12th, 13th, 14th, 15th, 16th, 17th, 18th

References

External links
 Ballotpedia
  (State Senate district information based on U.S. Census Bureau's American Community Survey).
 

Senate
Government of Essex County, Massachusetts
Massachusetts Senate